The Suburban Lakes League (SLL) was an OHSAA athletic league with 7 member schools located in northwest Ohio.  The league was formed in 1972 by former members of the Northern Lakes League, Sandusky Bay Conference, and the Lakeshore Conference.

Members at the time of dissolution

Former members

League history

1970s
For the 1972-73 school year, Eastwood, Elmwood, and Genoa leave the Northern Lakes League to form the SLL with Gibsonburg, Lakota, and Oak Harbor from the Sandusky Bay Conference, and Otsego and Woodmore from the Lakeshore Conference.  Geographic location and comparable athletic competition were acknowledged as sound reasons for establishing the league.

1980s
At the end of the 1985-86 school year, Oak Harbor leaves to rejoin the Sandusky Bay Conference, leaving the SLL with seven members.
Northwood joined the league as the eighth member for the 1986-87 school year after the Lakeshore Conference had folded in the winter of 1985.

1990s
Lake becomes the ninth league member in 1996, leaving the NLL in similar fashion to its SLL predecessors.
In 1999, the SLL extended an invitation to Rossford to be its tenth member.  Rossford declined, which caused the SLL and TAAC to consider realigning their members with other area schools based on enrollment.

2000s
In 2000, Northwood leaves the league for the TAAC after Rossford declines to join the SLL as its tenth member.
In 2008, realignment issues are stirred up again when Lakota decides to leave for the Midland Athletic League in 2009, opening the door for another potential member.  Rossford was considered as the prime choice for replacement, but a 4-3 vote amongst member schools (4 in favor, 3 against) turned them down.  6 schools would have had to approve Rossford's admission due to the 75% vote clause.
In 2009, both Rossford and Fostoria High Schools were turned down as potential members with the current members not gathering the necessary 6-1 vote.  However, the 7 SLL school principals later considered expanding the league to 12 members by the 2011-12 school year, with 2 divisions (Big Schools and Small Schools).  The 5 other schools were not specifically named, but it was noted that both Rossford and Fostoria fit the profile of the larger school division, which would have included Eastwood, Genoa, Lake, and Otsego. The smaller division would have consisted of Elmwood, Gibsonburg, Woodmore, and 3 other area schools close to their enrollment sizes.  Geography and size pointed at Northwood, Ottawa Hills, Cardinal Stritch, and Toledo Christian. Eastwood and Genoa's superintendents decided that the 12 team league would not work because they did not want Fostoria in their league.
In May 2009, Eastwood, Genoa, Lake, Otsego, and Woodmore agreed to withdraw from the Suburban Lakes League and form a new league with Rossford.  This was an attempt to circumvent the bylaws of the league after Rossford was voted down by a 5-2 vote (Rossford needed 75% (6 out of 7) of the vote to be added into the SLL).  It was decided that league play for the new Northern Buckeye Conference would begin in the fall of 2011.  This move left Elmwood and Gibsonburg as the lone members of the SLL for that time.
Elmwood was invited to join the Northern Buckeye Conference on August 12 along with Fostoria.
On September 9, 2009, Elmwood officially joined the NBC after being turned away from the MAL the day before.  Gibsonburg was also denied MAL membership, but they applied to join the Toledo Area Athletic Conference on September 16.
Gibsonburg was invited to join the TAAC on October 7, 2009.  They became a voting member of the league on January 1, 2010 and joined the TAAC when the Suburban Lakes League dissolved in 2011.

2010s
Athletic competition for the league ended with the conclusion of the spring sports seasons in 2011.

State Champions

BOYS

 Woodmore- Golf (Class A) - 1979, 1981
 Gibsonburg - Baseball (Div. IV) - 2005
 Eastwood- Track & Field (Div. II) - 2009, 2010

GIRLS

 Lakota  - Track & Field (Class AA) - 1987
 Otsego - Volleyball (Div. III) - 1992
 Eastwood - Volleyball (Div. II) - 1993
 Woodmore - Cross Country (Div. II) - 1992, 1993
 Woodmore - Cross Country (Div. III) - 1994
 Woodmore - Track & Field (Div. III) - 1993
 Gibsonburg - Softball (Div. IV) - 2001, 2002, 2003

Football champions

See also
 Ohio High School Athletic Conferences

External links
List of SLL Football Champions
Oak Harbor leaving SLL at the end of the '85-'86 school year
Latest Meeting Appears Fruitful on Formation of New Prep League, Toledo Blade, 11 Dec 1970
SLL plans 12-team, 2-division alignment (March 25, 2009)
Possible Small Division members (from the Courier in Findlay, Ohio).
Rossford BOE Vote on May 18, 2009
5 from SLL join Rossford for new league
Elmwood considering a move to the MAL
Elmwood to join Northern Buckeye Conference
Gibsonburg applies to become TAAC member
Gibsonburg becomes eighth member of TAAC

References

Ohio high school sports conferences